Long Bottom is an unincorporated community in southern Olive Township, Meigs County, Ohio, United States.  It has a post office with the ZIP code 45743.

It lies on the Ohio River, located below Reedsville and above Portland.

The community was named for a river bottom near the original town site.

Education
Public education in the community of Long Bottom is provided by the Eastern Local School District. Campuses serving the community include Eastern Elementary School (Grades K-8) and Eastern High School  (Grades 9-12).

References

Unincorporated communities in Meigs County, Ohio
Ohio populated places on the Ohio River
Unincorporated communities in Ohio